Marius Flothuis, (30 October 1914 – 13 November 2001) born and died in Amsterdam, was a Dutch composer, musicologist and music critic.

Biography
Flothuis first took courses at Vossius Gymnasium in Amsterdam. Flothuis graduated in 1969 with a thesis on the arrangements of the works of Mozart.

In 1937, Marius Flothuis became assistant artistic director of the Concertgebouw in Amsterdam. In 1942 his career was interrupted because of his refusal to cooperate with occupying Germans. From 1946 to 1950 he was librarian at the Donemus Foundation, and was a music critic there until 1953. That year Flothuis re-joined the Concertgebouw orchestra, becoming artistic director until 1974.

Marius Flothuis was also professor of musicology at the Utrecht University from 1974 to 1983. His international reputation was then based on his studies devoted to Mozart. From 1980 to 1994, he was president of Zentral Institut für Mozart-Forschung in Salzburg. He was considered an authority in the field of Mozart music, which led him to write cadenzas for some of the composer's concertos.

Career as composer
As a composer, Flothuis remained largely self-taught. He first composed in a relatively conservative language. It was only in the 1960s that he broke away from this style and followed his personal intuition.

Flothuis' catalog contains more than a hundred opus numbers.

Flothuis recognized his marked preference for French composers like Debussy and Ravel. His compositions, in almost all genres, have little to do with the turbulence of contemporary classical music. His music conveys rather subtle and concisely expressed universal values, attuned to a classical balance.

Until the end of his life, Flothuis took an active part in Dutch musical life.

Compositions

Orchestral 
 1939–1940 Concertino, pour flûte, hautbois, clarinette, saxophone, trompette, timbales, piano et cordes, opus 8 
 Allegro aperto 
 Allegretto con moto (alla viennese) 
 Lento 
 Andante amoroso con moto 
 Allegretto con moto e leggiero 
 Poco sostenuto-Vivace-Poco sostenuto 
 Allegro vivace 
 1944 Concert for flute and orchestra, opus 19
 Introduzione-Tango e Walzer-Coda
 Rondo
 Variazioni
 1945 Concerto, pour cor principal et petit orchestre, opus 24
 Assez animé
 Grave et très soutenu
 Vif et alerte
 1946 Valses sentimentales, (orchestral version), opus 21
 1946–1948 Concert, for piano and small orchestra, opus 30
 Allegretto piacevole
 Larghetto
 Molto vivace
 1949 Capriccio, for string orchestra, opus 35 no. 2
 1951 Concert, for violin and small orchestra, opus 39
 Moderato
 Vivace
 Adagio
 1952 Slaet opten trommele, film music for small orchestra, opus 45
 1953 Fantasia per arpa e piccola orchestra, opus 51
 1954–1955 Sinfonietta concertante, for clarinet (in A), alto saxophone (in Es) and small orchestra, opus 55
 1955 Concert-ouverture, opus 56
 1956 Rondo festoso, for orchestra, opus 57
 1957 Concert, for clarinet and orchestra, opus 58
 Andante con moto-Allegro-Andante con moto
 Allegretto leggiero-Lento-Allegretto leggiero
 1957 Symfonische muziek, for full orchestra, opus 59
 Allegro
 Adagio molto espressivo, un poco strascinante
 Allegro agitato
 Andante maestoso
 1962 Spes patriae, sinfonietta for small symphony orchestra, opus 62
 Allegro con spirito
 Passacaglia con intermezzi (Andante tranquillo)
 Allegro vivace e impetuoso
 1963 Espressioni cordiali, sei bagattelle per orchestra a corde, opus 63
 1964 Celdroom, radiophonic scene for speaking voice, mixed choir and orchestra, opus 65 – text: Henk van Randwijk
 1964 Canti e giuochi, per flauto, oboe, clarinetto, fagotto, corno, orchestra a corde
 1968 Concertino, per oboe e piccola orchestra, opus 70b
 1971 Per sonare ed ascoltare, cinque canzoni per flauto ed orchestra, opus 73
 Chiaro e maestoso
 Vivace
 Adagio ma non troppo
 Allegretto leggiero
 Finale retrospettivo
 1977–1978 Five minute pieces for orchestra, contemporary music of the Netherlands
 1979 Cantus amoris, for  strings, opus 78
 1981 Frivolités, three pieces for strings, opus 81
 1993 Poème, pour harpe et petit orchestre, opus 96

Work for concert band and fanfare orchestra 
 1949 Capriccio, for concert band, opus 35 nr. 1

Cantatas 
 1946 Cantata Silesiana, for three-part female choir, flute, string quartet and harpsichord, opus 29 – tekst: Angelus Silesius
 1948–1949 Love and strife, a serious cantata for contralto, flute, oboe d'amore (also oboe), viola and 'cello, opus 34 – words by Kathleen Raine
 Mourning in spring 1943
 Sorrow
 Heroes
 Interlude
 Venus
 The moment
 Winged eros
 1951 Een Amsterdamsch lied, cantata for soprano and baritone solo, flute, clarinet, two violins, viola, violoncello, double bass and piano , opus 40 – text: Jan Campert
 1968 Fantasia quasi una cantata, for 12 strings, harpsichord and mezzo-soprano, opus 71 – text: Andri Peer
 1985–1986 Santa Espina, pour mezzo-soprano et orchestre, on themes from La Santa Espina by Enrice Morera i Viura, opus 88 – text: Louis Aragon

Works for choir 
 1944 Bicinia, for two-part female choir with or without accompaniment (2 violins, oboe and viola, 2 flutes, 2 althobos, 2 clarinets or other combinations), opus 20
 1933/1949 Het lied van 't dagelijks brood, for mixed choir, opus 36 no.2 – text: Bruno Schönlank
 1951 Vier antieke fragmenten, for a cappella mixed choir, opus 41
 Voorzang – text: Terpander
 Avondlied – text: Alkman
 Spreuk – text: Simonides
 Danslied – text: Alkman
 1952 Lente, for a cappella male choir, opus 36 nr. 3
 1953 Round, for eight-part mixed choir, opus 50 – text: Orlando Gibbons
 1960 Seizoenen a cycle for four-part female choir and flute, opus 61
 1976 Een lied voor Helene, for mixed choir
 1980 Music for USC, five pieces for a cappella choir, opus 79
 Love is anterior to life – text: Emily Dickinson
 Central Park at dusk – text: Sara Teasdale
 Forgetfulness – text: Hart Crane
 Vagabonds – text: Langston Hughes
 Dark summer – text: Louise Bogan
 1985 Herinnering, two songs for mixed choir a capella, opus 93 – text: Clara Eggink and Bertus Aafjes

Vocal music with orchestra or instruments 
 1937–1938 Vier Morgenstern liederen, for soprano and piano (or orchestra), opus 3 – text: Christian Morgenstern
 Der Morgen war von Dir erfüllt
 Es ist Nacht
 O, Nacht
 Wasserfall bei Nacht
 1939–1940 Sonnet, for mezzo-soprano and orchestra, opus 9 – text: Ernst Toller
 1940–1945 Twee sonnetten, for mezzo-soprano or baritone and piano, opus 10
 Hy droech onse smerten – text: Jacobus Revius
 Rebel, mijn hart – text: Jan Campert
 1942 Kleine ouverture, for soprano and orchestra, opus 14 – text: Christian Morgenstern
 1943 Vorfrühling, for mezzo-soprano and orchestra, opus 15
 Die blätterlosen Pappeln stehn so fein – text: Christian Morgenstern
 Es läuft der Frühlingswind durch kahle Alleen – text: Hugo von Hofmannsthal
 Härte schwand – text: Rainer Maria Rilke
 1945–1947 Tricinia, for tenor, baritone, and bass, opus 25
 1947–1948 To an old love, for mezzo-soprano and orchestra, opus 32 – tekst: Ellen Marsh
 1948–1950 Four trifles, for high voice and small orchestra, opus 33
 1949–1951 Zes Nederlandse volksliederen – Serie I, for two voices, opus 43
 1951 Zes Nederlandse minneliederen – Serie III, for voice and two instruments, opus 43
 1952  Kleine suite (vocalises), for soprano and orchestra, opus 47
 Maestoso
 Con grazia, non-troppo vivo
 Molto tranquillo
 Vivace e leggiero
 Lento grazioso
 1952/1995 Kleine suite (vocalises), for soprano, flute, violin, viola, violoncello and harp, opus 47a
 1953 Negro lament, for contralt, alto saxophone and piano, opus 49 – text: Langston Hughes
 Proem
 Harlem night song
 Troubled woman
 The white ones
 Roland Hayes beaten (Georgia: 1942)
 Epilogue
 1958–1960 Odysseus and Nausikaa, madrigal for soprano, alto, tenor, baritone and harp, opus 60 – text by Homer in translation by E.V. Rieu and fragments of Alkman and Sappho
 1965 Hymnus, for soprano and large orchestra, opus 67 – tekst: Ingeborg Bachmann, "An die Sonne"
 1978 Hommage à Mallarmé, for voice, flute, cello and piano, opus 80 – text: Stéphane Mallarmé
 1983 Vrijheid, for mixed choir, 2 reciters, mezzo-soprano, flute and string orchestra, opus 83
 Introitus
 Koor
 Canon
 Lied
 Koraal en Arioso
 Lied (herhaling)
 Intermezzo
 Finale en coda
 1988 November, three songs based on German poems for mezzo-soprano and piano, opus 90
 1992 ... ein fremdes Völkchen ..., Poems set by Rose Ausländer for four female voices (2 sopranos and 2 altos), Opus 95
 1996 Drei Lieder nach Gedichten von Günter Eich, for mezzo-soprano and piano, opus 99
 Wie grau es auch regnet
 Die Totentrompete
 Die Häherfeder
 1996–1997 Drei Lieder nach Gedichten von Günter Eich, version for mezzo-soprano and small ensemble, opus 99a
 1997 Adagio, für Streichorchester und Sprecherin, Opus 100 – text: Sophie Scholl
 2001 Saraband, for mezzo-soprano and harp, opus 103

Chamber music 
 1937 Sonate, for violoncello solo, opus 2
 Andante
 Allegro
 Adagio
 1939 Muziek bij Het drijvende eiland, for flute, two clarinets, trumpet, percussion, violin, double bass and piano, opus 5
 1942 Quintet, for flute, oboe, clarinet, bassoon and bass clarinet, opus 13
 1944 Aria, for trumpet and piano, opus 18
 1944 Aubade, for flute, opus 19a
 1944 Duettino pastorale, for two violins, opus 23 no. 2
 1945 Ronde champêtre, for flute and harpsichord, opus 19b
 1945 Sonatine, for trumpet, horn and trombone, opus 26
 1945 Trois pièces, for two horns, opus 24a
 1946 Vier bagatellen, for violin and piano, opus 23
 1950 Partita, for violin and piano, opus 38 no. 1
 1950–1951 Trio serio, for viola, violoncello and piano, opus 38 no. 2
 1951 Sonata da camera, for flute and harp, opus 42
 1951 Zes canonische inventies – Serie II, for 2 recorders, opus 43
 1952  Divertimento, for clarinet, bassoon, horn, violin, viola and double bass, opus 46
 Entrata
 Scherzo 1
 Canzone
 Scherzo 2
 Rondo
 Congedo
 1952 Kwartet, for two violins, viola and cello, opus 44
 Allegro impetuoso
 Lento
 Allegro appassionato
 Allegretto leggiero
 Finale (Poco adagio)
 1961 Cantilena e ritmi, for alto recorder and harpsichord, opus 48 no. 2
 1963 Quattro invenzioni, for four horns, opus 64
 1967 Concertino, for oboe, violin, viola and cello, opus 70a
 1975 Sonata, for flute, alto flute (in G), opus 76 nr. 2
 1978 Canzone, for 2 clarinets, basset horn and bass clarinet, opus 76 nr. 4
 1978 Pastorale, for pan flute, opus 76 nr. 6
 1979 Piccola fantasia, for flute, opus 76 nr. 7
 1983–1984 Trois nocturnes, for cello and harp, opus 84
 1985 Sonate, for oboe, horn and harpsichord, opus 85
 1985–1986 Capriccio, for soprano, alto, tenor, and baritone saxophones, opus 86
 1986 Preludio e fughetta, for three trumpets in C, opus 76 nr. 8
 1987 Adagio, for violin and piano, opus 89
 1989 Preludio, notturno e capriccio, for violin, viola and cello, opus 91
 1990 Impromptu for solo viola
 1991–1992 Quartetto II (Fantasia), for string quartet, opus 94
 1994–1995 Quintette, for flute, violin, viola, cello and harp, opus 97
 1996 Duetto per due violini, opus 98

Work for organ 
 1979 Eine alte Geschichte

Works for piano 
 1934 Scherzino, opus 0
 1935–1936 10 eenvoudige klavierstukken, opus 1
 1937–1938 Suite voor piano
 1944 Valses sentimentales, for piano four hands, opus 21
 1945 Oost West, thuis best, opus 27
 1947 Six moments musicaux, opus 31
 1954 Valses nobles, for piano four hands, opus 52
 1964 "Cadenzas for the Concertos in C major K.467 and in C major, K.503 by W.A. Mozart"
 1964 "Cadenzas for the Concertos in E flat major K.482 and in D major, K.537 by W.A. Mozart"
 1969–1970 Fünf Epigramme und ein Capriccio, for piano solo, opus 72
 1989–1990 Paesaggi, (Paysages – Landschaften) una fantasia per pianoforte, opus 92

Work for harpsichord 
 1953 Suite, for harpsichord
 Toccata
 Intermezzo I
 Passacaglia
 Intermezzo II (Canon)
 Fuga

Works for harp(s) 
 1950 Pour le tombeau d'Orphée, danse élégiaque pour harpe seule
 1951 Kleine suite, for twelf harps (in cooperation with Lex van Delden)
 Prelude
 Allegro
 Valse lente
 Fughetta
 Finale
 1963 Berceuse brève, for harp, opus 75 nr. 1
 1969 Allegro vivace, for two harps, opus 75 no. 2
 1975 Molto lento, for harp, opus 75 no. 3
 1978 Allegro, con precisione, for harp solo, opus 75 nr. 4
 1984/1994 Allegro fugato, for three harps, opus 75 nr. 5
 1985–1986 Six easy studies for harp, opus 87
 1986 Sonorités opposées, for harp solo, opus 75 no. 6
 1999 Rapsodie, for harp solo, opus 102

Work for guitar 
 1944 Twee stukken voor gitaar, opus 22
 Folia
 Habanera

Work for percussion 
 1975/1998 Adagio, for percussion instruments and piano (four hands), opus 74

Publications (selection) 
 Mozart. Den Haag 1940.
 Hedendaagse Engelse componisten. Amsterdam 1949.
 Pianomuziek. Bilthoven 1959.
 Mozarts Bearbeitungen eigener und fremder Werke. Amsterdam 1969 (PhD thesis)
 Notes on notes: selected essays. Buren 1974.
 'Mahler interpretiert Mahler', in: Nachrichten zur Mahler-Forschung, 9, September 1981. 
 75 jaar GeNeCo: de geschiedenis van het Nederlands Genootschap van Componisten. Amstelveen 1988.
 Denken over muziek, een bundel eerder verschenen artikelen. Kampen 1993.
 ... exprimer l'inexprimable ..., essai sur la mélodie française depuis Duparc. Amsterdam 1996.
 Mozarts Klavierkonzerte – Ein musikalischer Werkführer, München 1998. 
 Mozarts Streichquartette – Ein musikalischer Werkführer, München 1998.  
 'Autograph – Abschrift – Erstdruck. Eine kritische Bewertung', in:  Mozart-Jahrbuch 2001.  Kassel 2003.

Sources
Forbidden Music regained , Flothuis
Marius Flothuis · dbnl
Jaarboek van de Maatschappij der Nederlandse Letterkunde, 2003 · dbnl
Leo Smit Foundation
Donemus Webwinkel — Flothuis, Marius
Muziekencyclopedie – Marius Flothuis
Beynon, Emily: ‘An Introduction to Marius Flothuis (1914-2001)’, in: The New York Flute Club Newsletter, January 2021, p. 4-5, p. 7 https://www.nyfluteclub.org/uploads/newsletters/2020-2021/21-January-NYFC-Newsletter-final-low.pdf
Beynon, Emily: Flot! The Life and Music of Marius Flothuis, on YouTube

References

1914 births
Concert band composers
Musicians from Amsterdam
2001 deaths
Classical music critics
Dutch musicologists
Dutch classical composers
20th-century musicologists